WSPC (1010 AM) is a commercial radio station in Albemarle, North Carolina.  It broadcasts a talk radio format and is owned by Stanly Communications.  The radio studios and transmitter are on Magnolia Street in Albemarle.

By day, WSPC transmits with 1,000 watts, using a non-directional antenna, but because AM 1010 is a Canadian clear channel frequency, WSPC must reduce power at night to 64 watts to avoid interference.  Programming is also heard on 250-watt FM translator W297CE at 107.3 MHz.

Programming
Weekdays begin with a local news and information show hosted by Dave Andrews.  A tradio show, known as "The Trading Post," follows.  The rest of the weekday schedule is made up of nationally syndicated talk shows from Glenn Beck, Sean Hannity, Mark Levin and Coast to Coast AM with George Noory.  Most hours begin with world and national news from Fox News Radio.

WSPC carries Carolina Panthers NFL football.  It also airs University of North Carolina Tar Heels football and basketball, as well as Duke University sports.  Local high school football games are broadcast on Friday nights in the fall.

History
The station signed on in 1946, broadcasting from the Albemarle Hotel.  The original call sign was WABZ.

Robert D. Raiford was program director in 1947, at age 19.

While a student a Pfeiffer College in March 1949, longtime WFMY-TV personality Lee Kinard went to work at WABZ doing janitorial and filing duties. Later he became a DJ and producer. Kinard left Pfeiffer after one year and became a part owner of the station in 1952, along with station manager Bill Page, attorney Staton Williams, chiropractor Joe Ivester and farmer Keith Almond. Kinard left WABZ for WFMY in 1956.

An FM station at 100.9 was added later.  Today that station is WPZS.

The AM station established a separate identity as WWWX on 10 September 1979. On 15 February 1990, the station changed its call sign to WXLX and on 26 August 1994 to the current WSPC.

In April 1993, Bill and Susi Norman bought WXLX, which had gone off the air in November 1990. This was one of the first purchases of a second AM in the same community by the same owner. At first, WXLX simulcast the couple's other station, WZKY. Bill Norman was a Pfeiffer graduate who got his training at the college's station WSPC. Since the letters had become available, he put them on his station.

References

External links

SPC
Radio stations established in 1979
Albemarle, North Carolina
1979 establishments in North Carolina